Victor Nicolas Davis, CM (February 10, 1964 – November 13, 1989) was a Canadian Olympic and world champion swimmer who specialized in the breaststroke.  He also enjoyed success in the individual medley and the butterfly.

Biography
Victor Davis was born in Guelph, Ontario.  As a boy, Davis learned how to swim in the lakes around his home. He then joined the Guelph Marlin Aquatic Club at the age of 12.

During his career, Davis held several world records as the winner of 31 national titles and 16 medals in international competition. At the 1982 world championships in Guayaquil, Ecuador, he set his first world record while winning the gold medal in the 200-metre breaststroke.

At the 1984 Summer Olympics in Los Angeles, California, he won a silver medal in the 100-meter breaststroke event, then captured the gold medal in the 200-metre breaststroke, in the process establishing another world record. In recognition of his accomplishments, Davis was named Swimming Canada's Athlete of the Year three times and the Canadian government made him a Member of the Order of Canada.

A star of Canada's national swim team for nine years, he retired from competitive swimming in July 1989. He was voted into the Canadian Olympic Hall of Fame in 1985, and posthumously into Canada's Sports Hall of Fame in 1990, and the International Swimming Hall of Fame in 1994.

Death

A few months after his retirement, on November 11, 1989 while outside a nightclub in the Montreal suburb of Sainte-Anne-de-Bellevue, Davis was struck by a car driven by Glen Crossley, who fled the scene. Crossley told police he hit Davis while trying to avoid a juice bottle Davis threatened to throw at the vehicle and didn't realize he made contact with the swimmer. However, other testimony showed that Davis was actually hit from behind and thrown  in the air before hitting his head on a parked car and a street curb.  Two days later, the 25-year-old swimmer died of a severe skull fracture as well as brain hemorrhage and spinal hemorrhage in hospital. In February 1992, Crossley was found guilty of leaving the scene of an accident and sentenced to ten months in prison, ultimately serving four months.

Legacy
Davis's parents fulfilled his express wish that his organs be donated to help save the lives of others. The swimmer's heart, liver, kidneys and corneas were transplanted.

Each year since his death, awards are made by the Victor Davis Memorial Fund to help young Canadian swimmers continue their education while training. Thirteen recipients of this award participated in the 2008 Summer Olympics. In 2002, Victor Davis was inducted into the Ontario Sports Hall of Fame.

In Guelph, the city named the 50m swimming pool in honour of Victor Davis.

Film
Davis's life, death and legacy were remembered in Victor, a two-hour biographical drama film that was written by the Canadian former swimmer Mark Lutz, who also appeared in the title role.

Career highlights
1982 World Aquatics Championships – Guayaquil, Ecuador
Gold medal – 200 m breaststroke (world record 2:14.77, breaking the old record of 2:15.11 set by David Wilkie in 1976)
Silver medal – 100 m breaststroke

1982 Commonwealth Games – Brisbane, Australia
Gold medal – 200 m Breaststroke
Silver medal – 100 m Breaststroke

1984 Canadian Olympic Trials – Etobicoke, Ontario, Canada
Won the 200 m breaststroke (broke his own world record with a time of 2:14.58, bettering his 1982 time)

1984 Summer Olympics – Los Angeles, United States
Gold medal – 200 m breaststroke (established world record at 2:13.34, lowering his own 1984 record time)
Silver medal – 100 m breaststroke
Silver medal – 4 × 100 m medley relay

1986 Commonwealth Games – Edinburgh, Scotland
Gold medal – 4 × 100 m medley relay
Gold medal – 100 m breaststroke
Silver medal – 200 m breaststroke

1986 World Aquatics Championships – Madrid, Spain
Gold medal – 100 m breaststroke
Silver medal – 200 m breaststroke

1988 Summer Olympics – Seoul, South Korea
Silver medal – 4 × 100 m medley relay (1.00.90 split)
Fourth place – 100 m breaststroke (1.02.38)

Canadian National Championships (including separate trials meets)
17-time national champion, 100 m breaststroke
14-time national champion, 200 m breaststroke
2-time national champion, 200 m butterfly
2-time national champion, 200 m individual medley
1 national championship, 400 m individual medley

See also
 List of members of the International Swimming Hall of Fame
 List of Commonwealth Games medallists in swimming (men)
 List of Olympic medalists in swimming (men)
 World record progression 200 metres breaststroke

References

External links
Official Victor Davis Movie Site
See Dave Stubbs review of the making of the movie here.

Swimnews Magazine in 2000 ran a retrospective on Davis, see pages 6 – 7..
Victor Davis Memorial Fund page – part of Guelph Marlin Aquatic Club website
Victor Davis Memorial Fund Page - Swimming Canada
CBC (TV) Archives looking back at the 1984 LA Olympics

 
 
 

1964 births
1989 deaths
Accidental deaths in Quebec
Canadian male backstroke swimmers
Canadian male breaststroke swimmers
Canadian male medley swimmers
Commonwealth Games gold medallists for Canada
Deaths from cerebrovascular disease
Deaths from head injury
World record setters in swimming
Medalists at the 1984 Summer Olympics
Medalists at the 1988 Summer Olympics
Members of the Order of Canada
Olympic gold medalists for Canada
Olympic silver medalists for Canada
Olympic swimmers of Canada
Pedestrian road incident deaths
Road incident deaths in Canada
Sportspeople from Guelph
Swimmers at the 1984 Summer Olympics
Swimmers at the 1988 Summer Olympics
Swimmers from Ontario
World Aquatics Championships medalists in swimming
Olympic gold medalists in swimming
Olympic silver medalists in swimming
Swimmers at the 1982 Commonwealth Games
Swimmers at the 1986 Commonwealth Games
Commonwealth Games medallists in swimming
20th-century Canadian people
Medallists at the 1982 Commonwealth Games
Medallists at the 1986 Commonwealth Games